Jacimović is a Macedonian (Јачимовиќ) and Jaćimović Serbian surname  Јаћимовић. Notable people with the surname include:

 Dragoljub Jacimović (born 1964), Macedonian chess grandmaster 
 Marko Jaćimović
 Predrag Jaćimović (born 1957), Serbian basketball coach

Serbian surnames
Macedonian-language surnames